Alfred Reed (January 25, 1921 – September 17, 2005) was an American neoclassical composer, with more than two hundred published works for concert band, orchestra, chorus, and chamber ensemble to his name. He also traveled extensively as a guest conductor, performing in North America, Latin America, Europe and Asia.

Life
Reed was born in New York and began his formal music training at the age of ten. During World War II, he served in the 529th Army Air Force Band. Following his military service, he attended the Juilliard School of Music, studying under Vittorio Giannini, after which he was staff composer and arranger first for NBC, then for ABC. In 1953, he became the conductor of the Baylor Symphony Orchestra at Baylor University, where he received his B.M. in 1955 and his M.M. in 1956. His master's thesis, Rhapsody for Viola and Orchestra, was awarded the Luria Prize in 1959. He was a member of the Beta Tau chapter of Phi Mu Alpha Sinfonia, the national fraternity for men in music.

From 1955 to 1966, he was the executive editor of Hansen Publications, a music publisher. He was the professor of music at the University of Miami, where he worked with composer Clifton Williams from 1966 until the latter's death in 1976. Williams' office was across the hall from Reed's office in the University of Miami School of Music, and Reed was chairman of the department of Music Media and Industry and director of the Music Industry Program at the time of his retirement.  He established the first college-level music business curriculum at the University of Miami in 1966, which led other colleges and universities to follow suit.  At the time of his death, he had composition commissions that would have taken him 31 years. Many of Reed's wind band compositions have been released as CD recordings by the Tokyo Kosei Wind Orchestra.

Works and arrangements

Works for orchestra 
 1962 Greensleeves - "What Child is This?"
 American Sketches - No. 1 "Strings 'n Things"
 American Sketches - No. 2 "Fashion Show"
 American Sketches - No. 3 "Country Night"
 American Sketches - No. 4 "By the Lagoon"
 American Sketches - No. 5 "The Mechanical Doll"
 Serenade
 Suite Concertante for strings and harp

Works for concert band 

 1944  Russian Christmas Music
 Carol of the Little Russian Children
 Antiphonal Chant
 Village Song
 Cathedral Chorus
 1952 Symphony for Brass and Percussion
 1955 Lumberjack Overture
 1956 Ballade for Solo Eb Alto Saxophone & Band
 1958 Might and Majesty, a Biblical Suite
 1959 Music Man
 The Wells Fargo Wagon
 Till There Was You
 Seventy-Six Trombones
 1962 A Festival Prelude
 1962 A Sacred Suite
 1962 rev. 1986 Greensleeves Fantasy for Concert Band
 1963 A Festive Overture
 1966 Rahoon for Solo Clarinet and Band
 1967 The Music-Makers
 1967 Passacaglia
 1968 Intrada Drammatica
 1968 Wapawekka - White Sands
 1970 A Jubilant Overture
 1970 The Pledge of Allegiance for Concert Band
 1971 A Ceremonial Fanfare
 1972 A Northern Legend
 1972 Armenian Dances Part 1, inspired by a collection of Folk Songs collected by Komitas Vardapet (1869–1935)
 Tzirani Tzar - The Apricot Tree
 Gakavi Yerk - The Partridge's Song
 Hoy, Nazan Eem - Hoy, My Nazan
 Alagyaz
 Gna, Gna - Go, Go!
 1972 Imperatrix
 1972 In Memoriam, an Elegy for the Fallen
 1973 Punchinello, Overture
 1973 Alleluia! Laudamus Te
 1976 First Suite for Band
 March
 Melody
 Rag
 Gallop
 1977 Armenian Dances Part 2 
 Hov Arek
 Khoomar
 Lorva Horovel
 1977 Othello A Symphonic Portrait for Symphonic Band in Five Scenes (after William Shakespeare)
 Prelude (Venice) - The tyrant custom hath made the flinty and steel couch of war my thrice-driven bed.
 Aubade (Cyprus) - Good Morning, General
 Othello and Desdemona - She loved me for the dangers I had passed, and I loved her that she did pity them.
 Entrance of the Court - Behold, the Lion of Venice!
 The Death of Desdemona; Epilogue - I kissed thee ere I killed thee: no way but this….
 1978 Prelude and Capriccio
 1978 Second Suite for Band (Latino Mexicana)
 Son Montuno
 Tango ("Sargasso Serenade")
 Guaracha
 Paso Double ("A la Corrida!")
 1979 Second Symphony for Band
 Lento (ma ritmico)
 Allegro con fuoco
 Molto moderato e sostenuto
 1980 A Christmas Intrada - Commissioned by the Middle Tennessee State University Band; Premiered October 1981 by "The President's Own" United States Marine Band at the 20th Annual Contest of Champions at Middle Tennessee State University.
 1981 Acalarado for Marching Band
 1981 The Hounds of Spring, A Concert Overture
 1981 Rushmore
 1982 Queenston Overture
 1982 The Garden of Proserpine Symphonic Pastorale
 1982 Viva Musica
 1982 Third Suite for Band (Scenes De Ballet)
 Fanfare and Intrada
 Pas de deux
 Polka excentrique
 Danse generale
 1983 Three Revelations from the Lotus Sutra
 To Awaken in the Light of the Universe
 To Contemplate the Depths of the Soul
 To Rejoice in the Beauty of Peace
 1984 Pro Texana Concert-March
 1985 El Camino Real
 1985 Ramparts of Courage
 1986 Second Century
 1988 Praise Jerusalem!
 1988 Third Symphony for Band
 Pesante e molto sostenuto Allegro agitado
 Variations on the "Porazzi" Theme of Wagner
 Allegro deciso
 1990 Mr. Music
 1991 A Springtime Celebration
 1992 Fourth Symphony for Band
 Elegy
 Intermezzo
 Tarantella
 1992 Hymn Variants
 1992–1993 Fourth Suite for Band - City of Music
 Intrada
 Arie
 Marsch
 1993 Concertino for Marimba and Winds
 1993 Greensleeves (arr.)
 1994 Fifth Symphony for Band
 Moderately and sustained
 Sakura (Cherry Blossoms)
 Allegro molto, con fuoco
 1995 Fifth Suite for Band (International Dances)
 Hoe Down (America)
 Sarabande (France)
 Yamabushi Kagura (Japan)
 Hora (Israel and Rumania)
 1995 The King of Love My Shepherd Is
 1997 Sixth Suite for Band
 March Miniature
 Summer Stroll
 Halloween Hobgoblin
 Awa Odori (Japanese Dance)
 1998 Prism
 1999 Millennium III Concert Overture
 2000 Children's Suite for Solo Alto-Saxophone and Band or Wind Ensemble
 Kiyoko's Lullaby
 Kiyoko's Playtime
 2000 Giligia (A Song of Remembrance)
 2002 Exhortation and Praise
 2003 Seventh Suite for Band A Century of Flight - composed as celebration for opening of Noto Airport in Wajima, Ishikawa, Japan and for centennial anniversary of Wright brothers' world's first flying by airplane
 prologue: Look to the Skies!
 Intermezzo: The Winds and Waves of Wajima
 March: To Fly With the Wings of Eagles
 2004 Ebo Signation
 A Christmas Celebration
 Angels We Have Heard On High
 It Came Upon The Midnight Clear
 A O Comell Ye Faithful (Adeste Fideles)
 Silent Night
 A little Concert-Suite
 Intrada
 Siciliana
 Scherzo
 Gigue
 Acclamation! A Global Greeting for Winds'
 Canto E Camdombe
 Choral Prelude In E Minor
 Concertino for Marimbaphon and Winds
 Nocturne
 Scherzetto
 Toccata
 Concerto for Trumpet and Winds
 Curtain Up! (A Theater Overture for Winds)
 Danza Caribe
 Evolutions
 East And West - The Kohoku New Town March
 Golden Jubilee
 Highlights from Exodus (arr.)
 Jesu, Joy of Man's Desiring (arr.)
 Jidai - Year Of Years!
 Millennium
 Music in the Air!
 O Little Town based on "O Little Town of Bethlehem" - for Choral Ensemble and Concert Band
 O Most Wonderful for Choral Ensemble and Concert Band
 Ode for Trumpet for Trumpet and Band
 Poetry and Power
 Rosalind in the Forest of Arden
 Seascape for Euphonium solo and Band
 Serenade
 Serenade for Clarinet and Band
 Siciliana Notturno for Alto-Saxophone and Concert Band
 Silver Shadow (Concert March)
 Slavonic Folk Suite for SATB Chorus (optional) and Band
 Children's Carol
 Cathedral Chorus
 Sleepers, Awake! (arr.)
 Symphonic Prelude
 The Big East March
 The Crowning Glory
 The Enchanted Island
 The Golden Years
 Twelfth Night A Musical Masque after William Shakespeare
 Prelude: Illyria
 Viola and Orsino
 The Merry Conspirators
 Malvolio's Lament in “Prison”
 V A Double Wedding, and All's Well!
 Two Bagatelles
 Victory! (Concert March for Winds)
 With Trumpets and Drums for drums, trumpet, voice, and band

Works for choir and orchestra 
 All Hall to the Days, Christian Madrigal for harp, piano or guitar in score, strings, mixed choir
 The Pledge of Allegiance for mixed choir and orchestra

Chamber music 
 1954 Organ Meditations for solo organ
 1983 Two Bagatelles for trombone quartet
 Double Wind Quintet
 Havana Moon for Clarinet Choir (3 bb, Alto, Bass, CBass), Percussion, Strings Bass
 Pastorale for Clarinet and Piano
 Scherzo Fantastique for Bass, Contrabass Clarinet, Contrabass, Piano, Woodwinds
 Siciliana Notturno for Solo Alto-Saxophone, Piano, Saxophone, Voice, Woodwinds
 Trilogue, Scherzo for Double Bass, Vibraphone, Marimba

External links
Alfred Reed Collection - Special Collections in Performing Arts at the University of Maryland Libraries
Alfred Reed interview, December 16, 1986

1921 births
2005 deaths
20th-century American composers
20th-century classical composers
20th-century American male musicians
American classical composers
American male classical composers
Baylor University alumni
Classical musicians from New York (state)
Concert band composers
Distinguished Service to Music Medal recipients
Musicians from New York City
University of Miami faculty
United States Army Air Forces personnel of World War II